Richard Wesley "House" Jones (born December 27, 1946) is a retired American professional basketball player.

A 6'6" forward from the University of Memphis, Jones played parts of seven seasons (1970–1976) in the American Basketball Association as a member of the Dallas/Texas Chaparrals, the San Antonio Spurs, and the New York Nets.  He won an ABA Championship with the Nets in 1976 and appeared in two ABA All-Star Games.

Jones also played one season for the Nets in the National Basketball Association after the ABA–NBA merger in 1976.  In his ABA/NBA career, he averaged 15.6 points per game and 7.4 rebounds per game.

The final score of Game 6 of 1976 ABA Finals was 112-106 with the Nets winning the ABA Championship over the Denver Nuggets, 4 games to 2, in New York at the Nassau Coliseum.  With 4 seconds left in the game, Jones, number 33 for the Nets that season, scored the last basket making him the last player to score points in the ABA.

References

External links
Career statistics

1946 births
Living people
African-American basketball players
American expatriate basketball people in Italy
American men's basketball players
Basketball players from Memphis, Tennessee
Centers (basketball)
Dallas Chaparrals draft picks
Dallas Chaparrals players
Illinois Fighting Illini men's basketball players
Memphis Tigers men's basketball players
New York Nets players
Pallacanestro Varese players
Phoenix Suns draft picks
Power forwards (basketball)
San Antonio Spurs players
Texas Chaparrals players
21st-century African-American people
20th-century African-American sportspeople